Emilio Colombo (11 April 1920 – 24 June 2013) was an Italian politician, member of the Christian Democracy, who served as Prime Minister of Italy from August 1970 to February 1972.

During his long political career, Colombo held many offices in several governments. He served as Minister of Agriculture from 1955 to 1958; Minister of Foreign Trade from 1958 to 1959; Minister of Grace and Justice from 1970 to 1972; Minister of Treasury from 1963 to 1970, in 1962 and from 1974 to 1976; Minister of Budget in 1968 and from 1987 to 1988; Minister of Finance from 1988 to 1989; Minister of Foreign Affairs from 1980 to 1993 and from 1992 to 1993. Colombo, a fervent Europeanist, served also as President of the European Parliament from 1977 to 1979.

In 2003, he was appointed Senator for life, a seat which he held until his death.

Early life and education
Colombo was born in Potenza, Basilicata on 11 April 1920. He grew up, along with his six brothers, in a middle-class family; his father, Angelo Colombo, was a public administration's official, while her mother, Rosa Tordella, was a housewife.

In 1935, he founded the first local section of Catholic Action (AC), a widespread Catholic association and one of the few non-fascist organizations, admitted by the regime of Benito Mussolini. In 1937, Colombo became the president of Potenza's Catholic Action and member of the National Council of Catholic Action's Youth. In the same year, he obtained the classical lyceum diploma at the "Quintus Horatius Flaccus" high school in Potenza.

In 1941, Colombo graduated in law at the Sapienza University of Rome, with a thesis on canon law. On 1 August 1942, he was enrolled and took part in the World War II. In September 1943, after the armistice, Colombo returned to Basilicata, starting his political commitment based on anti-fascist and Christian democratic principles. From 1944 to 1947 he was appointed general secretary of Catholic Action's Youth.

Political career
Colombo entered politics as a member of the Christian Democracy (DC) in 1943. In the 1946 election, Colombo was elected to Constituent Assembly of Italy with nearly 21,000 votes, becoming one of the youngest members of the parliament. He was elected for the constituency of Potenza–Matera, which will remain his stronghold for all his political career.

After two years, in 1948, Colombo was re-elected in the Chamber of Deputies for his constituency, with more than 43,000 votes. From May 1948 to July 1951, he was appointed undersecretary to the Ministry of Agriculture and Forests in the 5th and 6th governments of Alcide De Gasperi. During these years, Colombo was carried on a successful mediation in Calabria, in 1949, during clashes for the occupations of the lands by peasants. He also collaborated with minister Antonio Segni in the approving of the agrarian reform. The land reform, approved by the Parliament in October 1950, was financed in part by the funds of the Marshall Plan launched by the United States in 1947 and considered by some scholars as the most important reform of the entire post-war period. The reform proposed, through forced expropriation, the distribution of land to agricultural laborers, thus making them small entrepreneurs and no longer subject to the large landowner. If in some ways the reform had this beneficial result, for others it significantly reduced the size of farms, effectively removing any possibility of transforming them into advanced businesses. However, this negative element was mitigated and in some cases eliminated by forms of cooperation.

Prime Minister of Italy

A number of progressive reforms were introduced during Colombo's time as prime minister. A housing reform law of 22 October 1971 introduced new criteria for land expropriations and provisions for urban renewals. Under a law of 6 December 1971, state funds were made available for the construction of a kindergarten in every local authority. A law of 30 December 1971 introduced new regulations covering protection of female workers and maternity insurance.  The duration of maternity leave was extended two months prior to, and two months after confinement for all employees, and all female workers were entitled to an earnings-related indemnity, equal to 80% of earnings (including agricultural workers and tenant farmers). Also introduced was an entitlement to voluntary extra period of leave for six months during the first year of the child's life, with job security and an indemnity equal to 30% of earnings, together with an entitlement to paid absences due to the child's sickness during the first three years if the child's life. In addition, a special natality allowance was introduced for self-employed women in the agricultural, artisan, and commercial sectors.

Later he became president of the European Parliament (occupying that office from 1977 until 1979) and foreign minister of Italy (from 1980 until 1983, and again from 1992 until 1993). In February 2003 then president Carlo Azeglio Ciampi bestowed Italy's highest political honour on him, by nominating him Senator for life.

In the first five years as lifetime senator, he was an independent. From 2008 until his death in June 2013, Colombo was a member of the Autonomies group, formed mainly by elects in Trentino-Alto Adige/Südtirol.

After the inconclusive elections on 24–25 February 2013 and the following difficulties of the hung Senate in electing a presiding officer, Colombo became Provisional President of the Senate until the election of Pietro Grasso on 16 March 2013. The most oldest Senator, Former Prime Minister Giulio Andreotti, was due to inaugurate the new legislature but his unavailability benefited Colombo.

After the death of Giulio Andreotti on 6 May 2013, Colombo became the last surviving member of the Italian Constituent Assembly.

Personal life
In November 2003, he admitted to have used cocaine (for "therapeutic purposes") over a 12- to 18-month period.

Colombo died in Rome on 24 June 2013 at the age of 93.

Honours and awards 
: Grand Officier of the Legion of Honour
: Commemorative Medal of the 2,500 year celebration of the Persian Empire
 : Knight of Grand Cross of the Order of Merit of the Italian Republic 
 : Grand Cross of the Sacred Military Constantinian Order of Saint George 
: Gold Medal of the Jean Monnet Foundation for Europe, in 2011.

References

External links

1920 births
2013 deaths
People from Potenza
Christian Democracy (Italy) politicians
Italian Roman Catholics
Prime Ministers of Italy
Finance ministers of Italy
Foreign ministers of Italy
Members of the Constituent Assembly of Italy
Deputies of Legislature I of Italy
Deputies of Legislature II of Italy
Deputies of Legislature III of Italy
Deputies of Legislature IV of Italy
Deputies of Legislature V of Italy
Deputies of Legislature VI of Italy
Deputies of Legislature VII of Italy
Deputies of Legislature VIII of Italy
Deputies of Legislature IX of Italy
Deputies of Legislature X of Italy
Deputies of Legislature XI of Italy
Italian life senators
Senators of Legislature XIV of Italy
Senators of Legislature XV of Italy
Senators of Legislature XVI of Italy
Senators of Legislature XVII of Italy
Christian Democracy (Italy) MEPs
Presidents of the European Parliament
MEPs for Italy 1958–1979
MEPs for Italy 1979–1984
Politicians of Basilicata
Mayors of Potenza
Grand Officiers of the Légion d'honneur
Grand Crosses 1st class of the Order of Merit of the Federal Republic of Germany
Italian military personnel of World War II